Communauté d'agglomération du Saint-Quentinois is the communauté d'agglomération, an intercommunal structure, centred on the city of Saint-Quentin. It is located in the Aisne department, in the Hauts-de-France region, northern France. Created in 2017, its seat is in Saint-Quentin. Its area is 293.3 km2. Its population was 80,263 in 2019, of which 53,570 in Saint-Quentin proper.

Composition
The communauté d'agglomération consists of the following 39 communes:

Annois
Artemps
Aubigny-aux-Kaisnes
Bray-Saint-Christophe
Castres
Clastres
Contescourt
Cugny
Dallon
Dury
Essigny-le-Petit
Fayet
Fieulaine
Flavy-le-Martel
Fonsomme
Fontaine-lès-Clercs
Fontaine-Notre-Dame
Gauchy
Grugies
Happencourt
Harly
Homblières
Jussy
Lesdins
Marcy
Mesnil-Saint-Laurent
Montescourt-Lizerolles
Morcourt
Neuville-Saint-Amand
Ollezy
Omissy
Remaucourt
Rouvroy
Saint-Quentin
Saint-Simon
Seraucourt-le-Grand
Sommette-Eaucourt
Tugny-et-Pont
Villers-Saint-Christophe

References

Saint-Quentin
Saint-Quentin